Michael Christopher Thackwell (born 30 March 1961) is a former racing driver from New Zealand, who participated in a number of prominent racing categories, including Formula 1. The fifth youngest driver ever to qualify for a Grand Prix, he participated in five of them, making his first start on 28 September 1980 at the Canadian Grand Prix. He scored no championship points. He had previously attempted unsuccessfully to qualify for the Dutch Grand Prix which was held on 31 August 1980.

Thackwell has been described as a "teenage sensation", a "maverick" and as "something of a cult hero".  Outside Formula One, he competed successfully in Formula Three, Formula Two, Formula 3000 and sports cars, amongst other categories.

In 1984, Thackwell won the European Formula Two Championship.  He was runner up in that championship in 1983, and in its successor, the  International Formula 3000 Championship, in 1985.  In each case, he was driving a works Ralt.  Also in 1986, he won the Pau Grand Prix, again in a works Ralt.  Later in the year, he combined with Henri Pescarolo to win the 1000km Nürburgring sports car race, in a Sauber C8.

Early life
Thackwell was born into a motor racing family.  For many years, his father, Ray, was a successful international speedway rider and racing driver.  When Mike was six years old, his family emigrated from New Zealand to Perth, Western Australia, where he spent his formative years, and also began racing. Michael Thackwell has 4 siblings Joan Caccioppoli – Kerry John Thackwell – Lisa Brabham – Heidi Thackwell. Lisa is married to David Brabham.

Between 1972 and 1976, Thackwell attended Christ Church Grammar School, in Claremont, a suburb of Perth.  By the time of his Formula One debut in 1980, he spoke with an Australian accent, and regarded himself as Australian, but he competed, and liked to be known, as a New Zealander.

For three years from the age of nine, Thackwell competed in motocross events on motorcycles supplied by his father, an importer of high performance racing and sports cars. He then switched to karts, winning the Western Australian championship at the age of 14. After also winning the Hong Kong Kart Grand Prix in 1975 and 1976, he moved to England. A friend of Ray's, who built Formula Ford race cars put Mike in touch with Mike Eastick Scorpion Racing Drivers School at Thruxton in Hampshire.

Career

Starter formulae

In early 1978, Thackwell began his European career, in the Dunlop Star of Tomorrow Formula Ford championship, held in the United Kingdom.  He campaigned with a Van Diemen-Scholar RF78, entered by the Rushen Green team.  In a closely fought, 11-round series, he won five rounds, and made the podium on two other occasions, but finished only third in the championship, with 72 points, behind Canadian entrant Robert Zurrer (77 points) and British driver Terry Gray (76 points).

The following year, 1979, Thackwell moved up to the Vandervell British Formula 3 Championship, at the wheel of a March-Toyota 793, entered by the March works team.  In a 19-race series, he managed five more wins and four other podium finishes, along with a pole position and a fastest lap.  Once again, he finished the championship in third place, this time with 71 points, behind Chico Serra (103 points) and Andrea de Cesaris (90 points), but ahead of Stefan Johansson (fourth), Nigel Mansell (eighth), Alain Prost (equal 12th) and Thierry Boutsen (19th), all four of whom were later to have lengthy, and in most cases race-winning, Formula One careers.

Also in 1979, March entered Thackwell and the March 793 in two races of the FIA European Formula Three Championship.  He achieved a win and a fastest lap, at Monza in the Gran Premio della Lotteria.  In a championship won by Alain Prost, he also finished equal eighth overall, ahead of Boutsen (nine races), Arie Luyendyk (11 races), Serra (one race) and Philippe Streiff (five races) (equal thirteenth), and Jo Gartner (3 races; 21st).  Thackwell and the March 793 also managed pole position and fastest lap in the non-championship RAC FOCA Trophy race at Donington Park, but finished only ninth.

For 1980, Thackwell decided to follow Serra and de Cesaris into Formula Two. However, before that he returned to New Zealand to race a Marlboro-backed works March 792 in Aurora AFX New Zealand International Formula Pacific series, alongside de Cesaris. The cars, modified F2 cars, were overweight and under performed.

His return to Europe saw him again driving a March. As early as round two at Hockenheim he was on the pace, setting fastest lap, a feat he would repeat in the following round on the 14.272 mile Nürburgring Nordschleife. However it was at Zandvoort that he marked himself as a genuine talent.

Formula One debut

In 1980, having tested for both Ensign and Tyrrell, Thackwell had been signed by Ken Tyrrell to be a test driver for the Tyrrell F1 team, alongside his F2 campaign. He was invited to the Dutch Grand Prix by Tyrrell as a spectator, both to learn about the track and the Tyrrell 010 when Arrows team boss Jackie Oliver approached him after the first unofficial practice session to ask if he'd like to drive the Arrows A3. Oliver's regular driver, Jochen Mass had been injured at the previous grand prix, but his car was at Zandvoort. Although the car was still set up for Mass, including his seat and pedal arrangement, Thackwell got permission to drive the car from Tyrrell and though he failed to qualify, eventually set a faster time than Keke Rosberg in the Fittipaldi.

He made his official debut a few weeks later, when Tyrrell made the third car available for him at the Canadian Grand Prix. Because he took part in this event, Thackwell was often listed as the youngest driver to start a Formula One race, but this claim is arguable. On the first lap of the race, Alan Jones and Nelson Piquet collided at the first turn and were subsequently hit by a number of other cars, including Jean-Pierre Jarier and Derek Daly, both driving Tyrrells. Thackwell negotiated his way through the carnage and returned to the start/finish line undamaged by which time, the race had been red flagged. As both Jarier's and Daly's cars were too badly damaged to repair quickly, Thackwell was instructed by Ken Tyrrell to give up his car for Jarier. Under Formula One regulations, when the race is stopped after less than two full laps, the original start is declared null and void and the race starts anew. If a driver cannot bring their car back to the second start, they have technically not taken part in the Grand Prix.  Using these criteria, Ricardo Rodríguez remained the youngest race starter until Jaime Alguersuari broke the record at the 2009 Hungarian Grand Prix; a record that was subsequently broken by Max Verstappen in 2015.

Thackwell had another opportunity at the next race with Tyrrell, the United States Grand Prix. After he suffered a fractured brake disc during qualifying, he was unable to qualify to race at Watkins Glen.

Between Formula One

Thackwell's debut in a Tyrrell was unsuccessful; he returned to Formula Two in 1981. He was still considered to be one of stars of the future and was signed by Ralt to partner Geoff Lees. After winning the International Trophy at Silverstone, and a third place at Hockenheim, he suffered a massive testing accident driving the works Ralt-Honda at Thruxton that left him with a shattered heel and head injuries. According to Autosport he hit a bank head on and stopped from 140 mph to 0 mph in under 2 feet. Within weeks, although still on crutches, he completed the rest of the season and finished 6th in the Championship.

Unable to secure any works drive in 1982 owing to belief of team owners that he had still not recovered from his accident the previous year. With finance from family, friends and small sponsors, he managed to obtain a drive for the 1982 season in the small under-financed and privately run Horag Racing and Bertram Schäfer Racing Teams; he still managed two top three results at Pau and Spa-Francorchamps.

He rejoined the works Ralt team for 1983, coming second in that year's F2 championship to Jonathan Palmer, after a win at Jarama with another eight visits to the podium.
The following season he remained at Ralt, and despite having Roberto Moreno as teammate Thackwell went one better, dominating the championship, taking the title on the back of seven victories out of eleven races, including another success in the International Trophy race at Silverstone.  By the end of the season he had taken another six pole positions and nine fastest laps. He led a total of 408 of the 580 laps.

Return to Formula One

Suddenly in the middle of his season of dominance, Thackwell was back in demand again. However, this only amounted to two more fill-in one-off drives, the last of his career in F1.

For the Canadian Grand Prix, he replaced Palmer at the RAM team. He duly qualified in 25th place, one place higher than teammate Philippe Alliot, faster by 1.556 seconds. His race lasted until lap 30, when a broken turbo wastegate forced him into retirement. Palmer would reclaim his seat for the next race. Tyrrell wanted him to race in Germany, as Stefan Bellof was unavailable. Once again Thackwell failed to qualify for the German Grand Prix by just 0.055secs. He also tested for Williams during the season.

After Formula One
The opportunity to sample other racing categories arose. He drove in two World Endurance Championship races, coming 21st at the Nürburgring 1000km for Obermaier Racing in their Porsche 956 and finishing 5th in the 956 of Kremer Racing at the Fuji 1000km.
Thackwell finished the 1984 season in CART for Penske Racing, in their Pennzoil March 84C, after foot injuries at Sanair during practice for the Molson 300 sidelined Penske ace Rick Mears.  While not scoring any points in his two races, unlike Johnny Rutherford, who raced the first two races of Mears' eventual year and a half recovery as a substitute, the #6 team finished third overall in the 1984 season.

Unable to get a decent drive in F1 and CART, he turned his back on them and raced in the F2 replacement series, the Formula 3000. He won the first round at Silverstone and in the process, won his third International Trophy race. He added two victories before finishing runner-up to Christian Danner. Meanwhile, he also raced four times for the TWR Jaguar team, rounding his season off with a second place at the Shah Alam circuit, partnered by John Nielsen.

In 1986 he continued to win in F3000, both in Europe and Japan, and scored Mercedes-Benz's first modern racing success when he shared a Sauber with Henri Pescarolo to win the Nürburgring 1000km.

During the European winter of 1987, Thackwell returned to New Zealand to race in Formula Pacific. He won the first three rounds of the MANZ Formula Pacific International Championship, going on to take the title.
 
He concentrated on sports car racing with the Kouros Racing Team in their Sauber C9 in 1987, only to receive yet more disappointment. His only podium finish in the World Endurance series came after he quit and took a drive with Britten Lloyd Racing in their Porsche 962GTi, this time partnering Mauro Baldi.

In 1988 he had a one-off F3000 drive for the works Ralt outfit at Pau. However, having become disillusioned with motorsport, he turned his back on it at the end of 1988.

In the years following his withdrawal from motorsport, he worked, among other occupations, as a helicopter pilot in the North Sea for British International Helicopters, a gold miner in the North-West of Western Australia and as a teacher in England. He is widely felt to have been one of the great 'lost talents' – a driver in the wrong place at the wrong time. According to the English magazine Motorsport Thackwell now lives on the South Coast of England, where he spends his free time surfing summer and winter when waves allow.

Racing record

Career highlights

Complete European Formula Two Championship results
(key) (Races in bold indicate pole position; races in italics indicate fastest lap)

Complete International Formula 3000 results
(key) (Races in bold indicate pole position; races in italics indicate fastest lap.)

Complete Formula One results
(key)

American Open-Wheel racing
(key) (Races in bold indicate pole position)

CART PPG Indy Car World Series

24 Hours of Le Mans results

References

External links

 Driver Data Base profile
 Grandprix.com profile
 Mike Thackwell full biography – with images of Thackwell in F1, F2 and sports cars.
 Motorsport Flashback – Mike Thackwell: Teenage Sensation – New Zealand Classic Car Magazine retrospective profile, published 21 April 2011.

New Zealand Formula One drivers
New Zealand racing drivers
1961 births
Living people
European Formula Two Championship drivers
Japanese Formula Two Championship drivers
International Formula 3000 drivers
24 Hours of Le Mans drivers
Arrows Formula One drivers
Tyrrell Formula One drivers
RAM Racing Formula One drivers
Sportspeople from Auckland
World Sportscar Championship drivers
New Zealand Formula Pacific Championship drivers
British Formula Three Championship drivers
People from Papakura
Japanese Sportscar Championship drivers
Jaguar Racing drivers
David Price Racing drivers
Team Penske drivers
Sauber Motorsport drivers